Graeme James Love (born 7 December 1973), is a Scottish former professional footballer who played as a defender for several clubs in the Scottish Football League.

Career
Love joined Hibernian from Salvesen Boys Club in May 1991 and was a member of their SFA Youth Cup winning side in 1992. He went on to make 39 appearances in the Premier Division for Hibs over the next six seasons then later played for Ayr United, Queen of the South, Clydebank, East Fife and Stirling Albion.

Love stepped down to Junior level in 2001, joining his local club Bathgate Thistle and played in their Scottish Junior Cup winning side of 2008. He was appointed manager of Bathgate in June 2009, but was sacked in March 2012.

After leaving Bathgate, Love joined Livingston United as a player in August 2012.

References

External links

Living people
1973 births
Scottish footballers
Hibernian F.C. players
Ayr United F.C. players
Queen of the South F.C. players
Clydebank F.C. (1965) players
East Fife F.C. players
Livingston United F.C. players
Stirling Albion F.C. players
Association football defenders
Scottish Football League players
Scottish Junior Football Association players
Scottish football managers
Bathgate Thistle F.C. players
Scotland under-21 international footballers
Bathgate Thistle F.C. non-playing staff